Events from the year 1883 in Sweden

Incumbents
 Monarch – Oscar II
 Prime Minister – Arvid Posse, Carl Johan Thyselius

Events

 13 June - Carl Johan Thyselius assumed the position of Prime Minister.
 3 August: Amusement park Gröna Lund on the island of Djurgården in Stockholm is inaugurated.

 - Swedish Peace and Arbitration Society is founded.
 - Ellen Fries becomes the first female Ph.D.
 - Katarina Elevator
 - IS Lyckans Soldater
 - Stockholm University Student Union
 - Swedish Chemical Society  is founded.

Births
 17 November – Erik Granfelt, gymnast (died 1962).
 6 December – Anders Hylander, gymnast (died 1967).
 23 December – Hjalmar Cedercrona, gymnast (died 1969).

Deaths

 6 March - Cecilia Fryxell, educator   (born 1806)

References

 
Years of the 19th century in Sweden